Northwest Germanic is a proposed grouping of the Germanic languages, representing the current consensus among Germanic historical linguists. It does not challenge the late 19th-century tri-partite division of the Germanic dialects into North Germanic, West Germanic and East Germanic, but proposes additionally that North and West Germanic (i.e. all surviving Germanic languages today) remained as a subgroup after the southward migration of the East Germanic tribes, only splitting into North and West Germanic later. Whether this subgroup constituted a unified proto-language, or simply represents a group of dialects that remained in contact and close geographical proximity, is a matter of debate, but the formulation of Ringe and Taylor probably enjoys widespread support:
There is some evidence that North and West Germanic developed as a single
language, Proto-Northwest Germanic, after East Germanic had begun to
diverge. However, changes unproblematically datable to the PNWGmc period
are few, suggesting that that period of linguistic unity did not last long. On the
other hand, there are some indications that North and West Germanic
remained in contact, exchanging and thus partly sharing further innovations,
after they had begun to diverge, and perhaps even after West Germanic had
itself begun to diversify.

History and terminology
This grouping was proposed by Hans Kuhn as an alternative to the older view of a Gotho-Nordic versus West Germanic division. This older view is represented by mid 20th-century proposals to assume the existence by 250 BC of five general groups to be distinguishable: North Germanic in Southern Scandinavia excluding Jutland; North Sea Germanic along the middle Rhine and Jutland; Rhine-Weser Germanic; Elbe Germanic; and East Germanic. The Northwest Germanic theory challenges these proposals, since it is strongly tied to runic inscriptions dated from AD 200 onwards.

Dating
Most scholars agree that East Germanic broke up from the rest of the languages in the 2nd or 1st centuries BC. The Runic Inscriptions (being written from the 2nd century) may mean that the north and West broke up in the 2nd and 3rd centuries.  The Migration Period started around the 4th and 5th centuries; an event which probably help diversify the Northwest Germanic (maybe even the West Germanic) languages even more.
The date by which such a grouping must have dissolved—in that innovations ceased to be shared—is also contentious, though it seems unlikely to have persisted after 500 AD, by which time the Anglo-Saxons had migrated to England and the Elbe Germanic tribes had settled in Southern Germany.

Shared innovations
The evidence for Northwest Germanic is constituted by a range of common linguistic innovations in phonology, morphology, word formation and lexis in North and West Germanic, though in fact there is considerable debate about which innovations are significant. An additional problem is that Gothic, which provides almost the sole evidence of the East Germanic dialects, is attested much earlier than the other Germanic languages, with the exception of a few runic inscriptions. This means that direct comparisons between Gothic and the other Germanic languages are not necessarily good evidence for subgroupings, since the distance in time must also be taken into account.

The following shared innovations, which must have taken place in Proto-Northwest Germanic, can be noted:
 Lowering of stressed *ē to *ā.
 Raising of word-final *-ō to *-ū.
 Shortening of word-final *-ī and *-ū to *-i and *-u.
 Loss of *w between a consonant and unstressed *u.
 Unstressed *am > *um.
 Unstressed *er > *ar (if not already of Proto-Germanic date).
 *u/*ū > *i/*ī in the second-person pronouns.

Many common innovations are of post-Proto-Northwest Germanic date, however. These could have spread through an already differentiated dialect continuum, or have been present in latent form and solidified only in the individual dialects.
 Unstressed *ai > *ē and *au > *ō. In Norse, final *-aiz > -ar in the genitive singular of i-stems.
 Germanic a-mutation: stressed *u > *o before a non-close vowel, unless followed by a nasal and consonant. The West Germanic dialects differ in the outcome, with northern ones preserving *u while southern ones often have *o. The Proto-West Germanic situation thus cannot have been uniform, let alone the Proto-Northwest Germanic one.
 Rhotacism: *z > *r. This change postdated the West Germanic loss of word-final *-z, and there are minor differences in the development of *z in West Germanic as well.
 The replacement of reduplication with ablaut in the 7th class of strong verbs. This may have begun in the common history of North and West Germanic, but was not completed by the time of the split.

Alternative groupings
Postulated common innovations in North Germanic and Gothic, which therefore challenge the Northwest Germanic hypothesis, include:
 Proto-Germanic ,  > ,  (e.g. Gothic triggwa, ON tryggva, OHG triuwe, "loyalty", see Holtzmann's Law)

A minority opinion is able to harmonize these two hypotheses by denying the genetic reality of both Northwest Germanic and Gotho-Nordic, seeing them rather as mere cover terms indicating close areal contacts. (Such areal contacts would have been quite strong among the early Germanic languages, given their close geographic position over a long period of time.) Under such an assumption, an early close relationship between Nordic and Gothic dialects does not exclude a later similar relationship between remaining North and West Germanic groups, once the Gothic migration had started in the 2nd or 3rd century.

There are also common innovations in Old High German and Gothic, which would appear to challenge both the Northwest Germanic and the Gotho-Nordic groupings. However, these are standardly taken to be the result of late areal contacts, based the cultural contacts across the Alps in the 5th and 6th centuries, reflected in the Christian loanwords from Gothic into Old High German.

Notes

Sources

 

*

Germanic languages
Hypotheses
Linguistic theories and hypotheses